The Gospel Opportunities Radio Network is a group of non-commercial FM radio stations, based in Marquette, Michigan at 130 Carmen Drive.

Gospel Opportunities, Incorporated was formed in 1975 to provide religious radio programming in the Upper Peninsula of Michigan. WHWL became its first station when it went on the air in April 1976.  WHWL is a Christian station with a focus on Bible teaching programs and traditional, conservative music. Their current station manager, Andy Larsen, has been in the position since 2016 when he took over for the late Curt Marker.  The station usually has between 8-10 on-air radio personalities, highlighted by Kathy Kantola who runs the children's storytime program "Kathy's Kids Korner" weekdays from 1:30-4pm.

Stations
The main station of the Gospel Opportunities Radio Network is WHWL, is based in Marquette, Michigan and operates on 95.7 MHz with 100,000 watts. The station has two full-power repeater stations:

WEUL, which is licensed to Kingsford, Michigan, operates on 98.1 MHz with 1,000 watts and began operation in 1990.
WHWG, which is licensed to Trout Lake, Michigan, operates on 89.9 MHz with 1,000 watts and began operation in July 1999 as a replacement of translator W293AG on 106.5. Upon launching, WHWG was the first Christian radio station serving the Sault Ste. Marie/Newberry radio market.

Translators
Additionally, WHWL has 10 translator stations of its own:

Sources 
Michiguide.com - WHWL History
Michiguide.com - WEUL History
Michiguide.com - WHWG History

External links

Radio stations established in 1976
Christian radio stations in Michigan